The Faragher Brothers is a blue-eyed soul family band from Redlands, California. It initially consisted of brothers Tommy Faragher, Davey Faragher, Jimmy Faragher and Danny Faragher. Siblings Marty Faragher and Pammy Faragher joined the group in 1979.

History
Danny and Jimmy Faragher entered the music industry in 1964 by forming sunshine pop band Peppermint Trolley Company with Greg Tornquist and Casey Cunningham. Later, the band added Patrick McClure, changed their name to Bones and shifted to a folk rock direction.

After Bones disbanded in 1973, Danny and Jimmy formed The Faragher Brothers with brothers Tommy and Davey. They recorded four albums throughout their existence and were the first all-white band to have an appearance on Soul Train. They contributed backing vocals on numerous songs to artists such as Kiss, Melissa Manchester, Peter Criss, Ringo Starr, Randy Edelman and Lynda Carter. They broke up in 1980 and pursued their own interests.

Discography

Albums
1976: The Faragher Brothers
1977: Family Ties
1979: Open Your Eyes
1979: The Faraghers

Charted Singles

Members
Davey Faragher - Bass, Vocals
Jimmy Faragher - Guitar, Vocals
Danny Faragher - Vocals, Harmonica B3 Organ
Tommy Faragher - Electric Piano, Synth, Vocals
Marty Faragher - Drums, Percussion, Vocals
Pammy Faragher - Vocals

References

External links
Official website of Danny Faragher
Super Oldies biography on Peppermint Trolley Company

American soul musical groups
Rock music groups from California
Musical groups established in 1973
Musical groups from Los Angeles